= Le parfum de ma mère =

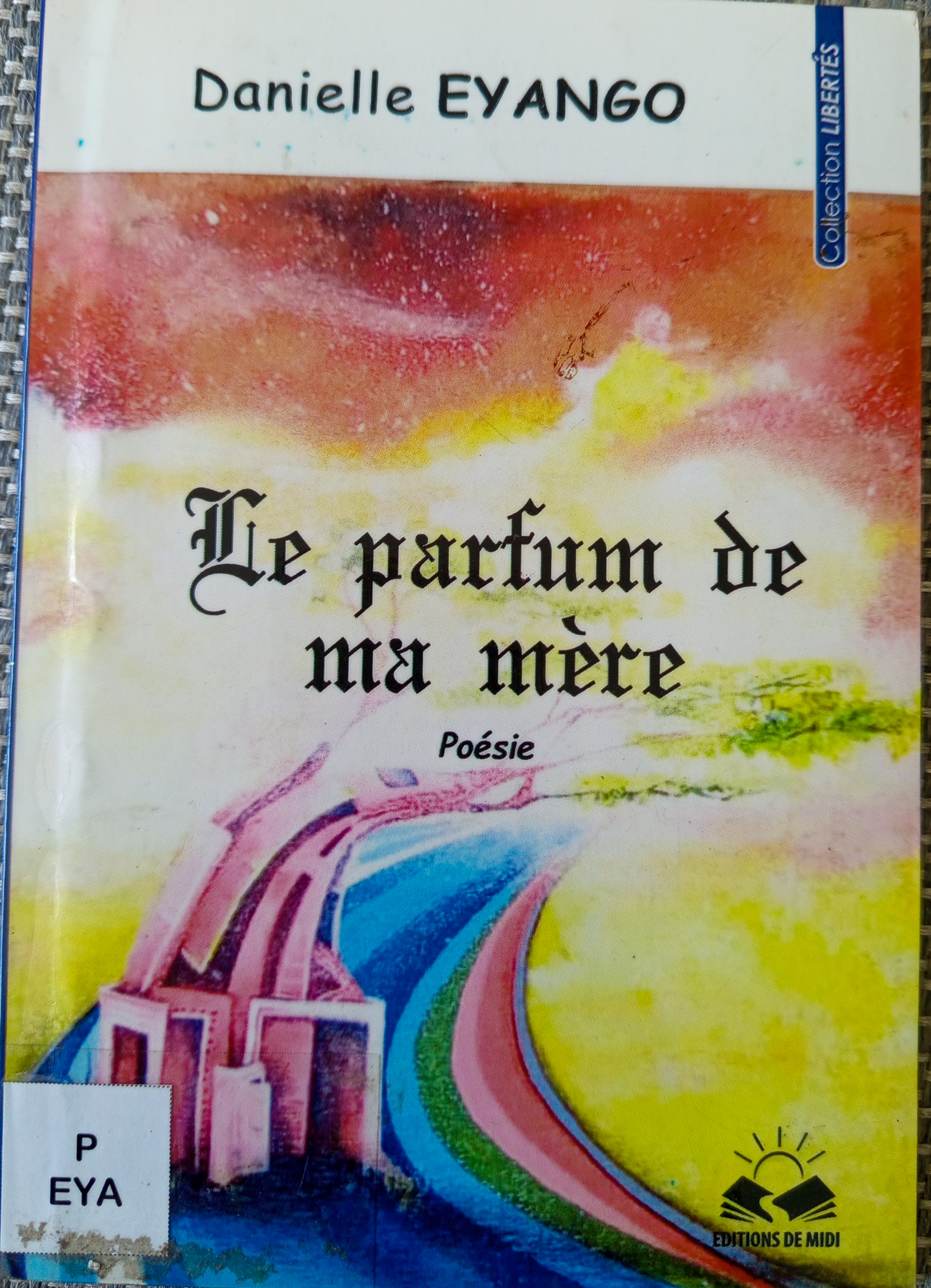
- Author: Danielle Eyango
- Language: French
- Subject: Motherhood, memory, identity, family heritage
- Genre: Poetry
- Published: 2020
- Publication place: Cameroon
- Awards: International Africa Poetry Prize (2020)

Le parfum de ma mere is a poetic work by the Cameroonian author Danielle Eyango.

== Summary ==
This collection of poems is a form of therapy, an initiatory journey, an introspection, allowing the reader to hear themselves, understand themselves, reveal themselves, and share their deepest self. This work is an exercise in sincerity, because, as the author says, "you will know the truth, and the truth will set you free".

== Background and inspiration ==
The author, Cameroonian writer Danielle Eyango often says "I write to heal". This sentence opens a door to the readers on the move of the writer: writing therapy. She showcase it here one time more with this book, a collection of poems, published on the afternoon editions in August 2020. This work contributed to Danielle Eyango's emergence as a notable voice in contemporary Cameroonian literature and poetry.
